Rijeka (also known as Fiume ,  ; local Chakavian: Reka;) is the principal seaport and the third-largest city in Croatia (after Zagreb and Split). It is located in Primorje-Gorski Kotar County on Kvarner Bay, an inlet of the Adriatic Sea and in 2021 had a population of 108,622 inhabitants. 
Historically, because of its strategic position and its excellent deep-water port, the city was fiercely contested, especially between the Holy Roman Empire, Italy and Croatia, changing rulers and demographics many times over centuries. According to the 2011 census data, the majority of its citizens are Croats, along with small numbers of Serbs, 
Bosniaks and Italians.

Rijeka is the main city and county seat of the Primorje-Gorski Kotar County. The city's economy largely depends on shipbuilding (shipyards "3. Maj" and "Viktor Lenac Shipyard") and maritime transport. Rijeka hosts the Croatian National Theatre Ivan pl. Zajc, first built in 1765, as well as the University of Rijeka, founded in 1973 but with roots dating back to 1632 and the local Jesuit School of Theology.

Apart from Croatian and Italian, linguistically the city is home to its own unique dialect of the Venetian language, Fiuman, with an estimated 20,000 speakers among the autochthonous Italians, Croats and other minorities. Historically Fiuman served as the main lingua franca among the many ethnicities inhabiting the multi-ethnic port city. In certain suburbs of the modern extended municipality the autochthonous population still speaks Chakavian, a dialect of Croatian.

In 2016, Rijeka was selected as the European Capital of Culture for 2020, alongside Galway, Ireland.

Name
Historically, Rijeka was also called Tharsatica, Vitopolis, or Flumen in Latin. The city is called Rijeka in Croatian, Reka in Slovene, and Reka or Rika in the local dialects of the Chakavian language. It is called Fiume in Italian. All these names mean "river" in their respective languages. Meanwhile, while in German the city has been called Sankt Veit am Flaum—St-Vitus-on-the-Flaum—or Pflaum.

Geography

Geographically, Rijeka is roughly equidistant from Milan, Budapest, Munich, Vienna and Belgrade. Other major regional centers such as Trieste, Venice and Ljubljana are all relatively close and easily accessible. The Bay of Rijeka, which is bordered by Vela Vrata (between Istria and the island of Cres), Srednja Vrata (between Cres and Krk Island) and Mala Vrata (between Krk and the mainland) is connected to the Kvarner Gulf and is deep enough (about ) to accommodate large commercial ships. The City of Rijeka lies at the mouth of the river Rječina and in the Vinodol micro-region of the Croatian coast. From three sides Rijeka is surrounded by mountains. To the west, the  Učka range is prominent. To the north/north-east there are the Snežnik plateau and the  Risnjak massif with the national park. To the east/south-east there is the  Velika Kapela range. This type of terrain configuration prevented Rijeka from developing further inland (to the north) and the city mostly lies on a long and relatively narrow strip along the coast. Two important inland transport routes start in Rijeka. The first route runs north-east to the Pannonian Basin. This route takes advantage of Rijeka's location close to the point where the Dinaric Alps are the narrowest (about ) and easiest to traverse, making it the optimal route from the Hungarian plain to the sea. It also makes Rijeka the natural harbour for the Pannonian Basin (especially Hungary). The other route runs north-west across the Postojna Gate connecting Rijeka with Slovenia and further through the Ljubljana Gap with Austria and beyond. A third more coastal route runs east-west connecting Rijeka (and—by extension—the Adriatic coastal cities to the south) with Trieste and northern Italy.

History

Ancient and Medieval times

 
Though traces of Neolithic settlements can be found in the region, the earliest modern settlements on the site were Celtic Tharsatica (modern Trsat, now part of Rijeka) on the hill, and the tribe of mariners, the Liburni, in the natural harbour below. The city long retained its dual character. Rijeka was first mentioned in the 1st century AD by Pliny the Elder as Tarsatica in his Natural History (iii.140). Rijeka (Tarsatica) is again mentioned around AD 150 by the Greek geographer and astronomer Ptolemy in his Geography when describing the "Location of Illyria or Liburnia, and of Dalmatia" (Fifth Map of Europe). In the time of Augustus, the Romans rebuilt Tarsatica as a municipium Flumen (MacMullen 2000), situated on the right bank of the small river Rječina (whose name means "the big river"). It became a city within the Roman Province of Dalmatia until the 6th century. In this period the city is part of the Liburnia limes (system of walls and fortifications against raiding Barbarians). Remains of these walls are still visible in some places today.

After the 4th century Rijeka was rededicated to St. Vitus, the city's patron saint, as Terra Fluminis sancti Sancti Viti or in German Sankt Veit am Pflaum. From the 5th century onwards, the town was ruled successively by the Ostrogoths, the Byzantines, the Lombards, and the Avars. The city was burned down in 452 by the troops of Attila the Hun as part of their Aquileia campaign. Croats settled the city starting in the 7th century giving it the Croatian name, Rika svetoga Vida ("the river of Saint Vitus"). At the time, Rijeka was a feudal stronghold surrounded by a wall. At the center of the city, its highest point, was a fortress.

In 799 Rijeka was attacked by the Frankish troops of Charlemagne. Their Siege of Trsat was at first repulsed, during which the Frankish commander Duke Eric of Friuli was killed. However, the Frankish forces finally occupied and devastated the castle, while the Duchy of Croatia passed under the overlordship of the Carolingian Empire. From about 925, the town was part of the Kingdom of Croatia, from 1102 in personal union with Hungary. Trsat Castle and the town was rebuilt under the rule of the House of Frankopan. In 1288 the Rijeka citizens signed the Law codex of Vinodol, one of the oldest codes of law in Europe.

In the period from about 1300 to 1466 Rijeka was ruled by a number of noble families, the most prominent of which was the German Walsee family. Rijeka even rivalled Venice when in it was sold by Rambert II Walsee to the Habsburg emperor Frederick III, Archduke of Austria in 1466. It would remain under Austrian Habsburg rule for over 450 years (except for a brief period of French rule between 1809 and 1813) until the end of World War I in 1918 when it was occupied by Croatian and subsequently by Italian irregulars.

Under Habsburg rule

Austrian presence on the Adriatic Sea was seen as a threat by the Republic of Venice and during the War of the League of Cambrai the Venetians raided and devastated the city with great loss of life in 1508 and again in 1509. The city did however recover and remain under Austrian rule. For its fierce resistance to the Venetians it will receive the title of the "most loyal city" ("fidelissimum oppidium") as well as commercial privileges from the Austrian emperor Maximilian I in 1515. While Ottoman forces attacked the town several times, they never occupied it. From the 16th century onwards, Rijeka's present Renaissance and Baroque style started to take shape. Emperor Charles VI declared the Port of Rijeka a free port (together with the Port of Trieste) in 1719 and had the trade route to Vienna expanded in 1725.

On November 28, 1750 Rijeka was hit by a large earthquake. The devastation was so widespread that the city had to be almost completely rebuilt. In 1753, the Austrian Empress Maria Theresa approved the funding for rebuilding Rijeka as a "new city" ("Civitas nova"). The rebuilt Rijeka was significantly different - it was transformed from a small medieval walled town into a larger commercial and maritime city centered around its port.

By order of Maria Theresa in 1779, the city was annexed to the Kingdom of Hungary and governed as corpus separatum directly from Budapest by an appointed governor, as Hungary's only international port. From 1804, Rijeka was part of the Austrian Empire (Kingdom of Croatia-Slavonia after the Compromise of 1867), in the Croatia-Slavonia province.

During the Napoleonic Wars, Rijeka was briefly captured by the French Empire and included in the Illyrian Provinces. During the French rule, between 1809 and 1813, the critically important Louisiana road was completed (named after Napoleon's wife Marie Louise). The road was the shortest route from Rijeka to the interior (Karlovac) and gave a strong impulse to the development of Rijeka's port. In 1813 the French rule came to an end when Rijeka was first bombarded by the Royal Navy and later re-captured by the Austrians under the command of the Irish general Laval Nugent von Westmeath. The British bombardment has an interesting side story. The city was apparently saved from annihilation by a young lady named Karolina Belinić who - amid the chaos and destruction of the bombardment - went to the English fleet commander and convinced him that further bombardment of the city was unnecessary (the small French garrison was quickly defeated and left the city). The legend of Karolina is warmly remembered by the population even today. She became a folk hero Karolina Riječka (Caroline of Rijeka) and has been celebrated in plays, movies and even in a rock opera.

In the early 19th century, the most prominent economical and cultural leader of the city was Andrija Ljudevit Adamić. Fiume also had a significant naval base, and in the mid-19th century it became the site of the Austro-Hungarian Naval Academy (K.u.K. Marine-Akademie), where the Austro-Hungarian Navy trained its officers.

Hungarian Crown 
During the Hungarian revolution of 1848, when Hungary tried to gain independence from Austria, Rijeka was captured by the Croatian troops (loyal to Austria) commanded by Ban Josip Jelačić. The city was then annexed directly to Croatia, although it did keep a degree of autonomy.

Giovanni de Ciotta (mayor from 1872 to 1896) proved to be an authoritative local political leader. Under his leadership, an impressive phase of expansion of the city started, marked by major port development, fuelled by the general expansion of international trade and the city's connection (1873) to the Austro-Hungarian railway network. Modern industrial and commercial enterprises such as the Royal Hungarian Sea Navigation Company "Adria", a rival shipping company the Ungaro-Croata (established in 1891) and the Smith and Meynier paper mill (which operated the first steam engine in south-east Europe), situated in the Rječina canyon, producing cigarette paper sold around the world.

The second half of the 19th century and the beginning of the 20th century (up to World War I) was a period of great prosperity, rapid economic growth and technological dynamism for Rijeka. Many authors and witnesses describe Rijeka of this time as a rich, tolerant, well-to-do town which offered a good standard of living, with endless possibilities for making one's fortune. The Pontifical Delegate Celso Costantini noted in his diary "the religious indifference and apathy of the town". The further industrial development of the city included the first industrial scale oil refinery in Europe in 1882 and the first torpedo factory in the world in 1866, after Robert Whitehead, manager of the "Stabilimento Tecnico Fiumano" (an Austrian engineering company engaged in providing engines for the Austro-Hungarian Navy), designed and successfully tested the world's first torpedo. In addition to the Whitehead torpedo factory, which opened in 1874, the oil refinery (1882) and the paper mill, many other industrial and commercial enterprises were established or expanded in these years. These include a rice husking and starch factory (one of the largest in the world), a wood and furniture company, a wheat elevator and mill, the Ganz-Danubius shipbuilding industries, a cocoa and chocolate factory, a brick factory, a tobacco factory (the largest in the Monarchy), a cognac distillery, a pasta factory, the Ossoinack barrel and chest factory, a large tannery, five foundries and many others. At the beginning of the 20th century more than half of the industrial capacity in Croatia (which was at that time mostly agrarian) was located in Rijeka.

Rijeka's Austro-Hungarian Marine Academy became a pioneering centre for high-speed photography. The Austrian physicist Peter Salcher working in the Academy took the first photograph of a bullet flying at supersonic speed in 1886, devising a technique that was later used by Ernst Mach in his studies of supersonic motion.

Rijeka's port underwent tremendous development fuelled by generous Hungarian investments, becoming the main maritime outlet for Hungary and the eastern part of the Austro-Hungarian Empire. By 1913–14, the port of Fiume became the tenth-busiest port in Europe. The population grew rapidly from only 21,000 in 1880 to 50,000 in 1910. Major civic buildings constructed at this time include the Governor's Palace, designed by the Hungarian architect Alajos Hauszmann. There was an ongoing competition between Rijeka and Trieste, the main maritime outlet for Austria—reflecting the rivalry between the two components of the Dual Monarchy. The Austro-Hungarian Navy sought to keep the balance by ordering new warships from the shipyards of both cities.

During this period the city had an Italian majority. In fact, according to the census of 1880, in Rijeka there were 9,076 Italians, 7,991 Croats, 895 Germans and 383 Hungarians. Some historians claim that the city had a Slavic majority at the beginning of the 19th century, because the 1851 census reported a Croatian majority. However, this census is considered not very reliable, especially by Italian historians.
At the last Austro-Hungarian census in 1910, the corpus separatum had a population of 49,806 people and was composed of the following linguistic communities:

By religion, the census of 1910 indicates that - from the total of 49,806 inhabitants - there were 45,130 Catholics, 1,696 Jewish, 1,123 Calvinist, 995 Orthodox and 311 Lutheran. The Jewish population expanded rapidly, particularly in the 1870s-1880s, and built a large synagogue in 1907 (which would be destroyed in 1944, during the German occupation, concurrent with the murder of most of the city's Jewish residents). At the eve of WWI, there were 165 inns, 10 hotels with restaurants, 17 cafés, 17 jewellers, 37 barbers and 265 tailor shops in Rijeka.

World War I 

World War I put an end to Rijeka's "golden era" of peace, stability and rapid economic growth. The city would never quite recover to the same level of prosperity. Initially there was a semblance of normalcy (the city was far from the frontlines), however - a growing part of the male population started to be mobilized by the army and the navy. The city's war-related industries continued to work full steam and contributed significantly to the Austro-Hungarian war effort, especially to the navy. The shipyard Ganz-Danubius produced a number of warships and submarines like the U-27-class submarines, the Novara-class cruisers, the large battleship SMS Szent István and others. In total, between the early 1900s and 1918 the city's shipyards produced 1 battleship, 2 cruisers, 20 destroyers, 32 torpedo boats and 15 submarines for the navy. Rijeka was also the main center for the production of torpedoes. However, a lot changed with the war becoming a protracted conflict and especially with the Italian declaration of war on Austria-Hungary in May 1915. This opened a frontline only 90 km from the city and caused a pervasive sense of anxiety among the large Italian population. Several hundred Italians, considered disloyal (enemy non-combatants) by the authorities, were deported to camps in Hungary (Tápiósüly and Kiskunhalas), where many died of malnutrition and diseases. The torpedo factory was attacked by the Italian airship "Citta` di Novara" in 1915 (later shot down by Austrian hydroplanes) and suffered damages. As a consequence - most of the torpedo production was moved to Sankt Pölten in Austria, further away from the frontlines. The city was again attacked by Italian airplanes in 1916 and suffered minor damage. The Naval Academy ceased its activities and was converted to a war hospital (the ex-naval academy buildings are still housing the city hospital to this day). On 10 February 1918 the Italian navy raided the nearby bay of Bakar causing little material damage but achieving a significant propaganda effect. As the war dragged on, the city's economy and the living standard of the population deteriorated rapidly. Due to a maritime blockade, the port traffic suffered a collapse - from 2,892.538 tons in 1913 (before the war) to only 330.313 tons in 1918. Many factories - lacking manpower and/or raw materials - reduced the production or simply closed. Shortages of food and other basic necessities became widespread. Even public safety became a problem with an increase in the number of thefts, violent incidents and war profiteering. The crisis escalated on October 23, 1918, when the Croatian troops stationed in Rijeka (79th regiment) mutinied and temporarily took control of the city. Amid growing chaos, the Austro-Hungarian empire dissolved a few weeks later, on November 12, 1918, starting a long period of instability and uncertainty for the city.

The "Fiume Question" and the Italian-Yugoslav dispute 

Habsburg-ruled Austria-Hungary's disintegration in October 1918 during the closing weeks of World War I led to the establishment of rival Croatian-Serbian and Italian administrations in the city; both Italy and the founders of the new Kingdom of the Serbs, Croats and Slovenes (later the Kingdom of Yugoslavia) claimed sovereignty based on their "irredentist" ("unredeemed") ethnic populations.

After a brief military occupation by the Kingdom of Serbs, Croats and Slovenes, followed by the unilateral annexation of the former Corpus Separatum by Belgrade, an international force of British, Italian, French and American troops entered the city in November 1918. Its future became a major barrier to agreement during the Paris Peace Conference of 1919. The US president Wilson even proposed to make Rijeka a free city and the headquarters of the newly formed League of Nations.

The main problem arose from the fact that Rijeka was not assigned either to Italy or to Croatia (now Yugoslavia) in the Treaty of London which defined the post-war borders in the area. It remained assigned to Austria-Hungary because - until the very end of WWI - it was assumed that the Austro-Hungarian empire would survive WWI in some form and Rijeka was to become its only seaport (Trieste was to be annexed by Italy). However, once the empire disintegrated, the status of the city became disputed. Italy based its claim on the fact that Italians comprised the largest single nationality within the city (46.9% of the total population). Croats made up most of the remainder and were a majority in the surrounding area. Andrea Ossoinack, who had been the last delegate from Fiume to the Hungarian Parliament, was admitted to the conference as a representative of Fiume, and essentially supported the Italian claims. Nevertheless, at this point the city had had for years a strong and very active Autonomist Party seeking for Rijeka a special independent status among nations as a multicultural Adriatic city. This movement even had its delegate at the Paris peace conference - Ruggero Gotthardi.

The Regency of Carnaro

On 10 September 1919, the Treaty of Saint-Germain was signed, declaring the Austro-Hungarian monarchy dissolved. Negotiations over the future of the city were interrupted two days later when a force of Italian nationalist irregulars led by the poet Gabriele D'Annunzio captured the city. Because the Italian government, wishing to respect its international obligations, did not want to annex Fiume, D'Annunzio and the intellectuals at his side eventually established an independent state, the Italian Regency of Carnaro, a unique social experiment for the age and a revolutionary cultural experience in which various international intellectuals of diverse walks of life took part (like Osbert Sitwell, Arturo Toscanini, Henry Furst, Filippo Tommaso Marinetti, Harukichi Shimoi, Guglielmo Marconi, Alceste De Ambris, Whitney Warren and Léon Kochnitzky).

Among the many political experiments that took place during this experience, D'Annunzio and his men undertook a first attempt to establish a movement of non-aligned nations in the so-called League of Fiume, an organisation antithetic to the Wilsonian League of Nations, which it saw as a means of perpetuating a corrupt and imperialist status quo. The organisation was aiming primarily at helping all oppressed nationalities in their struggle for political dignity and recognition, establishing links with many movements on various continents, but it never found the necessary external support and its main legacy remains today the Regency of Carnaro's recognition of Soviet Russia, the first state in the world to have done so.

The Liberal Giovanni Giolitti became Premier of Italy again in June 1920; this signalled a hardening of official attitudes to D'Annunzio's coup. On 12 November, Italy and Yugoslavia concluded the Treaty of Rapallo, which envisaged Fiume becoming an independent state, the Free State of Fiume, under a government acceptable to both powers. D'Annunzio's response was characteristically flamboyant and of doubtful judgment: his declaration of war against Italy invited the bombardment by Italian royal forces which led to his surrender of the city at the end of the year, after five days' resistance (known as Bloody Christmas). Italian troops freed the city from D'Annunzio's militias in the last days of December 1920. After a world war and additional two years of economic paralysis the city economy was nearing collapse and the population was exhausted.

The Free State of Fiume

In a subsequent democratic election the Fiuman electorate on 24 April 1921 approved the idea of a free state of Fiume-Rijeka with a Fiuman-Italo-Yugoslav consortium ownership structure for the port, giving an overwhelming victory to the independentist candidates of the Autonomist Party. Fiume became consequently a full-fledged member of the League of Nations and the ensuing election of Rijeka's first president, Riccardo Zanella, was met with official recognition and greetings from all major powers and countries worldwide. Despite many positive developments leading to the establishment of the new state's structures, the subsequent formation of a constituent assembly for the state did not put an end to strife within the city. A brief Italian nationalist seizure of power ended with the intervention of an Italian royal commissioner, and another short-lived peace was interrupted by a local Fascist putsch in March 1922 which ended with a third Italian intervention to restore the previous order. Seven months later the Kingdom of Italy itself fell under Fascist rule and Fiume's fate was therefore sealed, the Italian Fascist Party being among the strongest proponents of the annexation of Fiume to Italy. The Free State of Fiume thus was to officially become the first country victim of fascist expansionism.

The territory of Fiume part of the Kingdom of Italy 
The period of diplomatic acrimony was closed by the bilateral Treaty of Rome (27 January 1924), signed by Italy and Yugoslavia. With it the two neighbouring countries agreed to partition the territory of the small state. Most of the old Corpus Separatum territory became part of Italy, while a few Croatian/Slovenian-speaking villages to the north of the city were annexed by Yugoslavia. The annexation happened de facto on 16 March 1924, and it inaugurated about twenty years of Italian government for the city proper, to the detriment of the Croatian minority, which fell victim of discrimination and targeted assimilation policies.

The city became the seat of the newly formed Province of Fiume. In this period Fiume lost its commercial hinterland and thus part of its economic potential as it became a border town with little strategic importance for the Kingdom of Italy. However, since it retained the Free Port status and its iconic image in the nation-building myth, it gained many economic concessions and subsidies from the government in Rome. These included a separate tax treatment from the rest of Italy and a continuous inflow of investments from the Italian state (although not as generous as previous Hungarian ones). The city regained a good level of economic prosperity and was much richer than the surrounding Yugoslav lands,  but the economic and demographic growth slowed down if compared to the previous Austro-Hungarian period.

World War II and the German Operational Zone

At the beginning of World War II Rijeka immediately found itself in an awkward position. The city was overwhelmingly Italian, but its immediate surroundings and the city of Sušak, just across the Rječina river (today a part of Rijeka proper) were inhabited almost exclusively by Croatians and part of a potentially hostile power—Yugoslavia. Once the Axis powers invaded Yugoslavia in April 1941, the Croatian areas surrounding the city were occupied by the Italian military, setting the stage for an intense and bloody insurgency which would last until the end of the war. Partisan activity included guerrilla-style attacks on isolated positions or supply columns, sabotage and killings of civilians believed to be connected to the Italian and (later) German authorities. This, in turn, was met by stiff reprisals from the Italian and German military. On 14 July 1942, in reprisal for the killing of four civilians of Italian origin by Partisans, the Italian military killed 100 men from the suburban village of Podhum, resettling the remaining 800 people to concentration camps.

After the surrender of Italy to the Allies in September 1943, Rijeka and the surrounding territories were occupied and annexed by Germany, becoming part of the Adriatic Littoral Zone. Partisan activity continued and intensified. On 30 April 1944, in the nearby village of Lipa, German troops killed 263 civilians in reprisal for the killing of several soldiers during a Partisan attack.

The German and Italian occupiers and their local collaborators deported some 80 percent of the city's roughly 500 Jews to Auschwitz. A larger proportion of Rijeka's Jewish population was murdered in the Holocaust than that of any other city in Italian territory.

Because of its industries (oil refinery, torpedo factory, shipyards) and its port facilities, the city was also a target of more than 30 Anglo-American air attacks, which caused widespread destruction and hundreds of civilian deaths. Some of the heaviest bombardments happened on 12 January 1944 (attack on the refinery, part of the oil campaign), on 3–6 November 1944, when a series of attacks resulted in at least 125 deaths and between 15 and 25 February 1945 (200 dead, 300 wounded).

The area of Rijeka was heavily fortified even before World War II (the remains of these fortifications can be seen today on the outskirts of the city). This was the fortified border between Italy and Yugoslavia which, at that time, cut across the city area and its surroundings. As Yugoslav troops approached the city in April 1945, one of the fiercest and largest battles in this area of Europe ensued. The 27,000 German and additional Italian RSI troops fought tenaciously from behind these fortifications (renamed "Ingridstellung"—Ingrid Line—by the Germans). Under the command of the German general Ludwig Kübler they inflicted thousands of casualties on the attacking Partisans, which were forced by their superiors to charge uphill against well-fortified positions to the north and east of the city. The Yugoslav commanders did not spare casualties to speed up the capture of the city, fearing a possible English landing in area which would prevent their advance towards Trieste before the war was over. After an extremely bloody battle and heavy losses on the attackers side, the Germans were forced to retreat. Before leaving the city the German troops destroyed much of the harbour area and other important infrastructure with explosive charges. However, the German attempt to break out of the encirclement north-west of the city was unsuccessful. Of the approximately 27,000 German and other troops retreating from the city, 11,000 were killed or executed after surrendering, while the remaining 16,000 were taken as prisoners. Yugoslav troops entered Rijeka on 3 May 1945. The city had suffered extensive damage in the war. The economic infrastructure was almost completely destroyed, and of the 5,400 buildings in the city at the time, 2,890 (53%) were either completely destroyed or damaged.

Aftermath of World War II

The city's fate was once again solved by a combination of force and diplomacy. Despite insistent requests from the Fiuman government in exile collaboration with the partisans and calls to respect the city-state's internationally recognized sovereignty, and despite generous initial promises  given by the Yugoslav authorities of full independence and later of extensive autonomy for the city-state (the locals were promised various degrees of autonomy at different moments during the war, most notably the possibility to be a state of the Federal Republic of Yugoslavia), the city was annexed by Yugoslavia and incorporated as part of the federal state of Croatia. All the many voices of dissent within the population were silenced in the 12 months following the end of the war. The situation created by the Yugoslav forces on the ground was eventually formalized by the 1947  Paris peace treaty between Italy and the Allies on 10 February 1947, despite both the complaints by the last democratically-elected government and its president-in-exile Riccardo Zanella and the attempts of the experienced Italian foreign minister Carlo Sforza to uphold the previous Wilsonian plans for a multicultural Free State solution, with a local headquarters for the newly created United Nations. Once the change to Yugoslav sovereignty was formalized, and in particular in the years leading to the Trieste Crisis of 1954, 58,000 of the city's  66,000 inhabitants were gradually pushed  either to emigrate (they became known in Italian as esuli or the exiled ones from Istria, Fiume and Dalmatia) or to endure harsh oppression by the new Yugoslav Communist regime. The Yugoslav communist party opted for a markedly Stalinist approach to solving the local ethnic question, in particular after the Autonomist sympathisers gained massive support in the first local elections held on the city's territory between 1945 and 1946.

The discrimination and persecution that many inhabitants experienced at the hands of Yugoslav officials, in the last days of World War II and the first years of peace, still remain painful memories for the locals and the esuli, and are somewhat of a taboo topic for Rijeka's political milieu, which is still largely denying the events. Summary executions of alleged Fascists (often well-known anti-fascists or openly apolitical), aimed at hitting the local intellectual class, the Autonomists, the commercial classes, the former Italian public servants, the military officials and often also ordinary civilians (at least 650 executions of Italians took place after the end of the war) eventually forced most Italophones (of various ethnicities) to leave Rijeka/Fiume in order to avoid becoming victims of a harsher retaliation. The removal was a meticulously planned operation, aimed at convincing the hardly assimilable Italian part of the autochthonous population to leave the country, as testified decades later by representatives of the Yugoslav leadership.

The most notable victims of the political and ethnic repression of locals in this period was the Fiume Autonomists purge hitting all the autonomist figures still living in the city, and now associated in the Liburnian Autonomist Movement. The Autonomists actively helped the Yugoslav partisans in liberating the region from Fascist and Nazi occupation, and, despite receiving various promises of large political autonomy for the city, they were eventually all assassinated by the Yugoslav secret police OZNA in the days leading up to the Yugoslav army's victorious march into city and its aftermath.

In subsequent years, the Yugoslav authorities joined the municipalities of Fiume and Sušak and, after 1954, less than one third of the original population of the now united municipalities (mostly what was previously the Croat minority in Fiume and the majority in Sušak) remained in the city, because the old municipality of Fiume lost in these years more than 85% of the original population. The Yugoslav plans for a more obedient demographic situation in RIjeka culminated in 1954 during the Trieste crisis, when the Yugoslav Communist Party rallied many local members to ruin or destroy the most notable vestiges of the Italian/Venetian language and all bilingual inscriptions in the city (which had been legally granted a fully bilingual status after the occupation in 1945), eventually also 'de facto' (but not 'de jure') deleting bilinguilism, except in a handful of selected bilingual schools and inside the Italian Community's own building. After the war the local ethnic Italians of Rijeka left Yugoslavia for Italy (Istrian-Dalmatian exodus).

The city was then resettled by immigrants from various parts of Yugoslavia, once more changing heavily the city's demographics and its linguistic composition. These years coincided also with a period of general reconstruction and new program of industrialization after the destruction of the war. During the period of the Yugoslav Communist administration between the 1950s and the 1980s, the city became the main port of the Federal Republic and started to grow once again, both demographically and economically, taking advantage of the newly re-established hinterland that had been lacking during the Italian period, as well as the rebuilding  after the war of its traditional manufacturing industries, its maritime economy and its port potential. This, paired with its rich commercial history, allowed the city to soon become the second richest (GDP per capita) district within Yugoslavia. However, many of these industries and companies, being based on a socialist planned economic model were not able to survive the move to a market-oriented economy in the early 1990s.

As Yugoslavia broke up in 1991, the former Federal State of Croatia became independent and, in the Croatian War of Independence that ensued, Rijeka became part of the newly independent Croatia. Since then, the city has stagnated economically and its demography has plunged. Some of its largest industries and employers have gone out of business, the most prominent among them being the Jugolinija shipping company, the torpedo factory, the paper mill and many other small or medium manufacturing and commercial companies. Other companies have struggled to remain economically viable (like the city's landmark 3. Maj shipyard). The number of people working in manufacturing dropped from more than 80,000 in 1990 to only 5,000 two decades later. Privatization scandals and the large scale corruption which marked Croatia's transition from socialism to capitalism as well as several years of war economy played a significant role in the collapse of the city's economy during the 1990s and early 2000s. A difficult and uncertain transition of the city's economy away from manufacturing and towards an economy based on services and tourism is still in progress.

In 2018, it was announced that, 65 years after the abolition of Italian as the official language of the city, new Croatian-Italian bilingual signs will be placed back in the Fiume part of the modern united municipality.

In 2020, Rijeka was voted the European Capital of Culture alongside Galway, with a planned program including more than 600 events of cultural and social importance.

Rijeka's International Carnival 

The Rijeka Carnival (Croatian: Riječki karneval) is held each year before Lent (between late January and early March) in Rijeka, Croatia. Established in 1982, it has become the biggest carnival in Croatia. Every year there are numerous events preceding the carnival itself. First the mayor of Rijeka gives the symbolic key of the city to Meštar Toni, who is "the maestro" of the carnival, and he becomes the mayor of the city during the carnival, although this is only figuratively. Same day, there is an election of the carnival queen. As all the cities around Rijeka have their own events during the carnival time, Queen and Meštar Toni are attending most of them.

Also, every year the Carnival charity ball is held in the Governor's palace in Rijeka. It is attended by politicians, people from sport and media life, as well as a number of ambassadors.

The weekend before the main event there are two other events held. One is Rally Paris–Bakar (after the Dakar Rally). All of the participants of the rally wear masks, and the cars are mostly modified old cars. The other event is the children's carnival, held, like the main one, on Rijeka's main walkway Korzo. The groups that participate are mostly from kindergartens and elementary schools, including groups from other parts of Croatia and neighboring countries. In 1982 there were only three masked groups on Rijeka's main walkway Korzo. In recent years, the international carnival has attracted around 15,000 participants from all over the world organized in over 200 carnival groups, with crowds of over 100,000.

Demographics

In the census of 2011, the city proper had a population of 128,624, which included:

Other groups, including Slovenes and Hungarians, formed less than 1% each.

The Croatian census recognized two settlements within the City of Rijeka - the city itself with a population of 128,384, and "Bakar" with a population of 240, which is the village of Sveti Kuzam, separate from the neighboring town of Bakar. On 27 February 2014, Rijeka city council passed a decision to annex the settlement (named "Bakar-dio (Sv. Kuzam")) to the settlement of Rijeka.

The following tables list the city's population, along with the population of ex-municipality (disbanded in 1995), the urban and the metropolitan area.

 

 Ex-municipality: consists of other towns and municipalities (outside Rijeka city proper) in a former official union of adjacent settlements which was disbanded in 1995. It includes towns and municipalities of Kastav, Viškovo, Klana, Kostrena, Čavle, Jelenje, Bakar and Kraljevica.
 Urban area: considered as adjacent area. It includes the ex-municipality along with towns and municipalities of Opatija, Lovran, Mošćenička Draga and Matulji, which form urban agglomeration.
 Metro area: considered territory of consolidated expansion. It includes towns and municipalities of Crikvenica, Novi Vinodolski, Vinodolska, Lokve, Fužine, Delnice and Omišalj, which all gravitate towards the City of Rijeka.

Panoramas

Notable people from Rijeka 
Scientists, professors and inventors
 Antonio Grossich, Fiuman-Italian doctor, professor of surgery and inventor of the Tincture of iodine, senator and irredentist politician.
 Peter Salcher, Fiuman-Austrian physicist of the Fiume Academy, pioneer of ultrafast photography and aerodynamic studies.
 Sándor Alexander Riegler, Hungarian professor of chemistry and physics.
 Archduke Joseph Karl of Austria, Archduke of the Austro-Hungarian Empire, Romani language philologist and Romani ethnographer, member of the Hungarian Academy of Sciences.
 Robert Ludvigovich Bartini, Fiuman-Soviet aircraft designer and scientist, creator of the Bartini A-57 and Bartini Beriev VVA-14.
 Mihaly Csikszentmihalyi, Fiuman-Hungarian Psychology Professor at Claremont Graduate University, known as the architect of the notion of flow.
 Giovanni Luppis, Fiuman officer of the Austro-Hungarian Navy, lead inventor of the first torpedo.
 Paul Felix Nemenyi, Fiuman-Hungarian mathematician and physicist, and the probable father of former World Chess Champion Bobby Fischer.
 William Klinger, historian of Fiuman, Croatian and Yugoslav history.
 Umberto D'Ancona, Fiuman-Italian Biology Professor and founder of the Hydro-biological Station in Chioggia.
Giovanni Kobler, Fiuman historian, whose work is considered the major mile stone in the Rijeka historiography.
Aladár Fest, Fiuman-Hungarian pioneer pedagogue, historian that wrote his works in Hungarian, German and Italian.

Arts and culture
 Aldo Lado, Italian film director 
 Ödön von Horváth, Austro-Hungarian playwright, author of the play Geschichten aus dem Wiener Wald, winner of the Kleist Prize in 1931.
Heinrich von Littrow, Czech and Austrian poet, writer and cartographer.
 Marija Krucifiksa Kozulić, Catholic nun, founder of the order of the Sisters of the Sacred Heart of Jesus.
 Oretta Fiume, Fiuman-Italian cinema star of the '30-'40s, with her final role in Fellini's La Dolce Vita.
 Janko Polić Kamov, Croatian writer and poet from Sušak.
 Irma Gramatica, Fiuman-Italian stage and film actress.
 Geronimo Meynier, Fiuman-Italian teen film actor.
 Romolo Venucci, Fiuman-Italian cubist painter and sculptor.
 Osvaldo Ramous, Fiuman poet and writer that signed the town's 20th century literature and cultural life.
Leo von Littrow, Fiuman Impressionist artist, a major exponent of the artistic movement in Southern Europe.

Politics and institutions
 Riccardo Zanella, Fiuman politician, first and only elected president of the Free State of Fiume.
 Giovanni de Ciotta, Fiuman-Italian entrepreneur and politician.
 Michele Maylender, Fiuman politician during the Hungarian Crown's dependency, founder of the Autonomist Party of Fiume.
 Andrea Ossoinack, businessman and politician, among the founders of the Free State of Fiume and founder of the Autonomist League of Fiume.
Alexander von Hoyos, Fiuman-Hungarian diplomat who played a major role during the July Crisis while serving as chef de cabinet of the Foreign Minister at the outbreak of World War I in 1914.
 Leo Valiani, Fiuman-Italian historian, politician and journalist, a prominent dissident during the Italian fascist regime.
 Mario Blasich, Fiuman politician and physician, victim of the Fiume Autonomists purge of 1945.
 Miklós Vásárhelyi, Fiuman-Hungarian dissident and writer, famous for his decades-long fight against the Hungarian communist party headed by János Kádár.
 János Kádár, Chairman of the Central Committee of the Hungarian Communist Party, served for more than 30 years as the leader of Hungary.
 Giovanni Palatucci, last Italian superintendent of Fiume and Righteous Among The Nations.
 Kolinda Grabar-Kitarović, Croatia's 4th and first female president between 2015 and 2020.
Nino Host Venturi, Fiuman-Italian fascist leader, politician and historian.
Sebő Vukovics (Sava Vuković), Hungarian Minister of Justice in 1849 during the Hungarian Revolution of 1848

Economists and entrepreneurs
 Andrea Lodovico Adamich, Aristocratic trader from Fiume, builder, one of the most prominent supporters of economical and cultural development of the city.
 Robert Whitehead, English serial entrepreneur, known for developing the first effective self-propelled naval torpedo, in collaboration with Giovanni Luppis in Fiume.
 Luigi Ossoinack, serial entrepreneur and businessman, one of the main drivers in Fiume's economic boom during the second half of the 19th century.

Sportsmen
 Mirza Džomba, Croatian handball player, world champion and Olympic champion.
 Ezio Loik, Italian footballer, member of the Grande Torino team which won 5 consecutive Serie A titles in the 1940s and the Italian national team.
Mario Varglien, Italian footballer, Juventus player with record presences and world champion in 1934.
 Abdon Pamich, Fiuman-Italian race walker, gold medalist at the 1964 Tokyo Summer Olympics.
 Ulderico Sergo, Fiuman-Italian professional boxer, gold medalist at the 1936 Summer Olympics in Berlin.
 Orlando Sirola, Fiuman-Italian tennis player
 Luciano Sušanj, Fiuman-Croatian politician, European athletic champion
 Oscarre Vicich, footballer 
 Vladimir Vujasinović, Serbian water polo player, World and European champion, Olympic silver and bronze medalist

Musicians
 Ivan Zajc, Fiuman-Croatian composer, conductor, director and teacher
 Dino Ciani, Fiuman-Italian pianist
 Damir Urban, Croatian musician and singer-songwriter, former member of the band Laufer

Other
 Agathe Whitehead, Fiuman-born English heiress and mother of the Trapp Family Singers

Main sights

Tvornica "Torpedo" (the Torpedo factory). The first European prototypes of a self-propelled torpedo, created by Giovanni Luppis, a retired naval engineer from Rijeka. The remains of this factory still exist, including a well-preserved launch ramp used for testing self-propelled torpedoes on which in 1866 the first torpedo was tested.
The Croatian National Theatre building. Officially opened in October 1885, the grand theatre building includes work by the famous Venetian sculptor August Benvenuti and ceiling artist Franz Matsch, who collaborated with Ernst and Gustav Klimt.
Svetište Majke Božje Trsatske – the Sanctuary of Our Lady of Trsat. It is home to the Gothic sculpture of the Madonna of Slunj and to works by the Baroque painter C. Tasce.
Trsat Castle, a 13th-century fortress, which offers magnificent vistas from its bastions and ramparts, looking down the Rječina river valley to the docks and the Kvarner Gulf.
Petar Kružić staircase (or Trsat stairway), which links downtown Rijeka to Trsat. The stairway consists of 561 stone steps and was built for the pilgrims as the way to reach the Sanctuary of Our Lady of Trsat.
Old gate or Roman arch. At first it was thought that this was a Roman Triumphal Arch built by the Roman Emperor Claudius Gothicus but later it was discovered to be just a portal to the pretorium, the army command in late antiquity.
Rijeka Cathedral, dedicated to St. Vitus.
Palace Modello designed by Buro Fellner & Helmer and built in 1885.
Stadion Kantrida, was included on CNN's list of the world's most iconic and unusual football stadiums in 2011.
Art installation "Masters", a site-specific art installation by Czech artist Pavel Mrkus was permanently placed beneath the high ceiling vault on the inner balconies of Rijeka's fish market. The installation consists of a video segment - a projection of Mrkus's video recorded on the DIMI fishing trawler while fishing in the Kvarnerić waters – and it is accompanied by an audio segment of the sounds of the sea and a fishing boat that can only be heard in the fish market gallery. It is a story that pays homage to those who are never seen here, but without whom there would be no fish on the tables.
Art installation "Balthazartown Beach", a site-specific art installation found its place on the Grčevo beach, more commonly known as Pajol or Šestica, located at the very end of Pećine near the Viktor Lenac Shipyard. Under the mentorship of artist Igor Eškinja, students of the Academy of Applied Arts of the University of Rijeka designed a steel sculpture that changes the observer's experience of the environment and they created 15 inscriptions on a concrete plateau that encourage everyone to play and are visible only when in contact with water. The artistic process is inspired by the theme of Professor Balthazar, the world-famous and award-winning animated series, in which the scenographer used Rijeka as the primary inspiration in the creation of Balthazartown.

Climate

Rijeka has a humid subtropical climate (Cfa by the Köppen climate classification) with warm summers and relatively mild and rainy winters. The terrain configuration, with mountains rising steeply just a few kilometres inland from the shores of the Adriatic, provides for some striking climatic and landscape contrasts within a small geographic area. Beaches can be enjoyed throughout summer in a typically Mediterranean setting along the coastal areas of the city to the east (Pećine, Kostrena) and west (Kantrida, Preluk). The Kvarner Bay and its islands are visible from the ski slopes.
Unlike typical mediterranean locations, Rijeka does generally not see a summer drought. Snow is rare (usually three days per year, almost always occurring in patches). Fog appears in about four days per year, mainly in winter. The climate is also characterized by frequent rainfall. Cold (bora) winds are common in wintertime.

Transport

The Port of Rijeka is the largest port in Croatia, with a cargo throughput in 2017 of 12.6 million tonnes, mostly crude oil and refined petroleum products, general cargo and bulk cargo, and 260,337 twenty-foot equivalent units (TEUs). The port is managed by the Port of Rijeka Authority. The first record of a port in Rijeka date back to 1281, and in 1719, the Port of Rijeka was granted a charter as a free port. There are ferry connections between Rijeka and the surrounding islands and cities, but no direct international passenger ship connections. There are coastal lines to Split and onward to Dubrovnik, which operate twice weekly and have international connections.

The city is difficult to get to by air outside of the tourist season. The city's own international airport, Rijeka Airport is located on the nearby island of Krk across the tolled Krk Bridge. Buses, with a journey time of approximately 45 minutes, operate from Rijeka city center and nearby Opatija, with a schedule based on the planned arrival and departure times of flights. Handling 200,841 passengers in 2019, the facility is more of a charter airport than a serious transport hub, although various scheduled airlines have begun to service it with a comparatively large number of flights coming from airports in Germany. Most of these flights only operate during the tourist season between approximately May and October. Alternative nearby airports include Pula (around 90 minutes drive from Rijeka), Trieste (around 90 minutes), Ljubljana (around 2 hours), Zagreb (around 2 hours) and Venice (around 3 hours).

Rijeka has efficient road connections to other parts of Croatia and neighbouring countries. The A6 motorway connects Rijeka to Zagreb via the A1, while the A7 motorway, completed in 2004, links Rijeka with Ljubljana, Slovenia, via Ilirska Bistrica and with Trieste, Italy. The A7 acts as the Rijeka bypass motorway and facilitates access to the A8 motorway of the Istrian Y network starting with the Učka Tunnel, and linking Rijeka with Istria. As of August 2011, the bypass is being extended eastwards to the Krk Bridge area and new feeder roads are under construction.

Rijeka is integrated into the Croatian railway network and international rail lines. A fully electrified railway connects Rijeka to Zagreb and beyond towards Koprivnica and the Hungarian border as part of Pan-European corridor Vb. Rijeka is also connected to Trieste and Ljubljana by a separate electrified line that extends northwards from the city. Rijeka has direct connections by daily/night trains to Prague, München, Salzburg, Ljubljana, Bratislava and Brno. Construction of a new high performance railway between Rijeka and Zagreb, extending to Budapest is planned, as well as rail links connecting Rijeka to the island of Krk and between Rijeka and Pula.

Bus connections 
Rijeka Bus Station is connected by regular bus lines with all major Croatian cities such as Zagreb, Osijek, Slavonski Brod, Đakovo, Nova Gradiška, Požega, Vukovar, Gospić, Karlovac, Zadar, Šibenik, Split, Makarska and Dubrovnik. Departures are frequent in the direction of Istria, the islands of Cres, Lošinj, Krk, Rab and Pag and the towns around Crikvenica, Novi Vinodolski and Senj. From international lines, there are regular departures in the direction of Germany, Switzerland, Italy, Bosnia and Herzegovina and Serbia.

KD Autotrolej d.o.o. is a carrier of passengers in the area of the City of Rijeka and cities / towns in the suburbs (the so-called Rijeka ring).

Sports
The history of Rijeka's organised sports started between 1885 and 1888 with the foundation of the Club Alpino Fiumano in 1885, the Young American Cycle Club in 1887 (the first club of this American league to be founded in a foreign land), and the Nautico Sport Club Quarnero in 1888 by the Hungarian minority of the city. Even earlier, in 1873, following the initiative by Robert Whitehead, the first football match to be disputed in today's Republic of Croatia territory was played in Rijeka: the Hungarian Railways team and the English engineers-led team of the Stabilimento Tecnico di Fiume (later Torpedo Factory of Fiume). The first football club in Fiume was founded under the name of Fiumei Atletikai Club.

Today, HNK Rijeka are the city's main football team. They compete in the Croatian First Football League and were the champions of Croatia in 2016–17. Until July 2015, HNK Rijeka were based at the iconic Stadion Kantrida. With Kantrida awaiting reconstruction, they are based at the newly built Stadion Rujevica, their temporary home ground located in the club's new training camp. Additionally, HNK Orijent 1919 are based in Sušak and play in the Croatian Second Football League.

Rijeka's other notable sports clubs include RK Zamet and ŽRK Zamet (handball), VK Primorje EB (water polo), KK Kvarner (basketball) and ŽOK Rijeka (women's volleyball).

Rijeka hosted the 2008 European Short Course Swimming Championships. In its more than 80 years of history, LEN had never seen so many records set as the number of them set at Bazeni Kantrida (Kantrida Swimming Complex). A total of 14 European records were set of which 10 world records and even 7 world-best times. This championship also presented a record in the number of participating countries. There were more than 600 top athletes, from some 50 European countries. Swimmers from 21 nations won medals and 40 of the 51 national member Federations of LEN were present in Rijeka.

International relations

Twin towns – sister cities

Rijeka is twinned with:

In popular culture
The German western Winnetou movies from the 1960s, based on Karl May novels, were in part filmed on location in the outskirts of Rijeka.

Marvel's villain Purple Man originates from this city, and Rijeka has been present in many of the character's stories.

The setting of the 1970s cartoon series Professor Balthazar was inspired by Rijeka.

The 1980s American TV series The Winds of War was in part filmed in Rijeka and the surrounding areas.

A stylised version of Fiume during the 1920s was one of the main settings in the 1992 movie Porco Rosso by world acclaimed Japanese director Hayao Miyazaki, as the town in front of which the fantastical "Hotel Adriano" is found and to which it is connected by a boat service taken by the protagonist.

Bruce Sterling's November 2016 novel, written in collaboration with Warren Ellis, Pirate Utopia, a dieselpunk alternative history, is set in Fiume (now Rijeka) in 1920 during the short-lived Italian Regency of Carnaro.

The TV series Novine (The Paper), which has been streaming on Netflix since April 2018, is based in Rijeka and the city was used as the main filming location.

In 2019 the movie The Hitman's Wife's Bodyguard with was in part filmed in Rijeka.

Recently Rijeka - with its historic industrial sites, unusual hilly setting, sweeping views and retro architecture - has become a popular location for the filming of TV-advertisements. Examples include advertisements for the Belgian internet provider Telenet, Japanese tire manufacturer Bridgestone, German retail chain DM, Japanese Honda Civic Type R cars, Ukrainian seafood restaurant chain Flagman, Slovenian soft drink brand Cockta, German car manufacturer Mercedes and others.

See also

Quotes about Rijeka
Čavle
Charter of Carnaro was the constitution of the Italian Regency of Carnaro, a short-lived government in Fiume (Rijeka)
Crikvenica
Drenova, Rijeka
Fiume (disambiguation)
Geography of Croatia
Ilario Carposio
Kastav
Kostrena
Kvarner Gulf
List of governors and heads of state of Fiume
Primorje-Gorski Kotar County
Robert Whitehead
Rječina
Sušak
Trsat
Fužine

References

Bibliography

 Reill, Dominique Kirchner. The Fiume Crisis: Life in the Wake of the Habsburg Empire (2020) online review

Notes

External links

Rijeka Tourist Board
Port of Rijeka Authority
Old Postcards of Fiume
Rijeka detailed map

 
Oil campaign of World War II
Cities and towns in Croatia
Populated coastal places in Croatia
Port cities and towns of the Adriatic Sea
Mediterranean port cities and towns in Croatia
Populated places in Primorje-Gorski Kotar County
Italian-speaking territorial units in Croatia
Capitals of former nations